Joanne Millman (born 18 August 1961) is an Australian former soccer player who played for the Australia women's national soccer team between 1983 and 1989.

References

1961 births
Australian women's soccer players
Australia women's international soccer players
Living people
Women's association footballers not categorized by position
Soccer players from Brisbane
Sportswomen from Queensland